Wamanripayuq (Quechua wamanripa Senecio, -yuq a suffix, "the one with the wamanripa", also spelled Huamanripayoc) is a mountain in the Chunta mountain range in the Andes of Peru, about  high. It lies in the Huancavelica Region, Castrovirreyna Province, on the border of the districts of Castrovirreyna and Santa Ana.

References

Mountains of Huancavelica Region
Mountains of Peru